Katara may refer to:
 Katara (dagger), a type of dagger from the Indian subcontinent 
 Katara (Avatar: The Last Airbender), a character in the television series Avatar: The Last Airbender
 Katara Cultural Village, a cultural and commercial complex in Doha, Qatar
 Katara Pass, a mountain pass in northern Greece
 Katara (spice), a Venezuelan Amazon spicy sauce made from chilli pepper and Bachacho - Atta laevigata poison